Edward Marshall may refer to:

 Edward Marshall (sculptor) (1598-1675) 17th century English sculptor and Master Mason to King Charles II
 Edward C. Marshall (1821–1893), U.S. Representative from California
 Edward Carrington Marshall (1805–1882), Virginia farmer, planter, businessman, and politician.
 Edward Marshall (rower) (1908–?), American rower
 Doc Marshall (infielder) (Edward Harbert Marshall, 1906–1999), infielder in Major League Baseball

See also
 Ted Marshall, British art director